Toomas Väinaste (born 24 January 1950 in Soonuka) is an Estonian politician. He was a member of XIII Riigikogu.

He has been a member of Estonian Centre Party.

References

Living people
1950 births
Estonian Centre Party politicians
Members of the Riigikogu, 2015–2019
Estonian University of Life Sciences alumni
People from Vinni Parish